A topper in comic strip parlance is a small secondary strip seen along with a larger Sunday strip. In the 1920s and 1930s, leading cartoonists were given full pages in the Sunday comics sections, allowing them to add smaller strips and single-panel cartoons to their page.

Toppers usually were drawn by the same artist as the larger strip. These strips usually were positioned at the top of the page (hence their name), but they sometimes ran beneath the main strip.

Toppers were introduced by King Features Syndicate during the 1920s, enabling newspaper editors to claim more comic strips without adding more pages. The practice allowed newspapers to drop the topper and place another strip or an additional advertisement into the Sunday comics section. They also made it possible to reformat a strip from full-page size to tabloid size.

In 1904, Frederick Opper drew his And Her Name Was Maud, about the kicking mule Maud, into comic strips, books and animation, but on May 23, 1926, Opper positioned And Her Name Was Maud as the topper to his Happy Hooligan, and it ran along with Happy Hooligan until both strips came to a conclusion on October 14, 1932. On May 16, 1926, Harold Knerr began , a topper to The Katzenjammer Kids, which ran until two years after his death. By 1936, to avoid any association with Hitler, the dog's name was changed from Adolph to Schnappsy (a.k.a. Schnapps). Knerr's strip was reformatted for reprints in Magic Comics in the early 1940s.

Billy DeBeck's topper for Barney Google was Parlor Bedroom and Sink, which evolved into Parlor Bedroom and Sink Starring Bunky and eventually was titled simply Bunky. In the mid-1930s, DeBeck added alongside Bunky a single-panel topper, Knee-Hi-Knoodles, depictions of kids' funny remarks (contributed by readers). Bunky spawned the catchphrase, "Youse is a viper, Fagin." A big fan of Bunky was pulp author Robert E. Howard, who liked to quote from the strip, as noted by his friend Tevis Clyde Smith:

Spinoffs
Characters in toppers sometimes turned up in the main strip, such as Herby appearing in Smitty, and Kitty Higgins joining the cast of Moon Mullins. In a few cases, the topper introduced characters later developed into a successful Sunday page, as happened when Krazy Kat became a spin-off from The Family Upstairs and Roy Crane's Wash Tubbs appeared over J. R. Williams' Out Our Way with the Willets Sunday strip. The Wash Tubbs Sunday strip ran in that format from 1927 until 1933, when Crane launched Captain Easy as a Sunday page (featuring Wash Tubbs as a secondary character).

Gene Ahern's topper The Squirrel Cage, which ran above his Room and Board, is notable because of the repetitive use of the nonsensical question, '"Nov shmoz ka pop?", which was never translated yet became a national catchphrase. As a consequence, The Squirrel Cage is today better remembered than Room and Board, despite its 17-year run.

On at least one occasion, a character exited the topper and dropped down into the main strip. This happened on April 17, 1938, when an absent-minded character in the Rosie's Beau topper realized he was in the wrong place and climbed down into the first panel of Bringing Up Father, arriving in the living room of Maggie and Jiggs. During the 1940s, Snookums ran as the topper above Bringing Up Father. In the final episode of HBO's The Pacific (2010), Robert Leckie (James Badge Dale) is seen reading Snookums.

During its long run, Pete the Tramp had several topper strips, as detailed by comic strip historian Allan Holtz:

Toppers bottom out
In half-page format comics, toppers at times appeared at the bottom; if removed, the remaining comic fit in a third page. Some toppers consisted of only a single panel, an example being those that accompanied Joe Palooka in the mid-1940s. Holtz notes:

And further:

Some strips continued to supply toppers into the 1960s, and in a few cases even the 1970s. Maw Green in Little Orphan Annie was the last Sunday strip topper, except for the brief use of the topper parodies Sawdust and The Invisible Tribe in Dick Tracy. Many newspapers in the late 1980s ran Jim Davis' U.S. Acres alongside Davis' own Garfield (also the most popular comic at the time). However, both were stand-alone strips and sold separately (also, unlike most toppers, U.S. Acres also had a daily strip until very late in its run).

Some underground and alternative comic artists have used toppers in their work, though not in the context of a Sunday strip. The strip Fat Freddy's Cat appeared as a topper in the underground comic book The Fabulous Furry Freak Brothers. Tony Millionaire's weekly comic strip Maakies is perhaps the only contemporary syndicated strip to run a topper (which appears at the bottom of the main strip and lacks a consistent title). Toppers have also been used in some comics by Chris Ware and Daniel Clowes to mimic the format of a Sunday comics page. A variant of the topper, "throwaway" panels containing a "throwaway gag" (inessential to the thrust of the strip) remain common , and allow different formats depending on available space.

Notable toppers
Alley OopDinny's Family Album (1934-1937)
Barney GoogleBughouse Fables (1926), Bunky (originally Parlor Bedroom and Sink, 1926-1948), Knee-Hi-Knoodles (single panel, 1934-1935)
BlondieThe Family Foursome (1930-1935), Colonel Potterby and the Duchess (1935-1958, running as a stand-alone strip until 1963)
Boob McNuttBertha the Siberian Cheesehound (1926, started as a topper but soon became a supporting character with Boob)
Boots and Her BuddiesBabe 'n' Horace (1939-1968)
Bringing Up FatherRosie's Beau (1926-1944), Snookums (1944-1956)
The Bungle FamilyLittle Brother (1926-1937), Short Stories (1937-1938)
The Captain and the KidsHawkshaw the Detective (drawn by Gus Mager, 1931-1952)
ConnieThe Wet Blanket (1931-1936)
Count ScrewlooseBanana Oil, Babbling Brooks, Otto and Blotto
Dick TracyCrimestopper's Textbook (1949-present, now running as a throwaway panel)
Ella CindersChris Crusty (1931-1941)
The Family UpstairsKrazy Kat (bottom, first Krazy Kat appearance)
The Fabulous Furry Freak BrothersFat Freddy's Cat (bottom, underground imitation of vintage strip format)
Felix the CatLaura (1926-1935), Bobby Dazzler (1935-1940)
Flash GordonJungle Jim (1934-1954, sometimes published as separate strip)
Freckles and His FriendsHector (1944-1973)
Gasoline AlleyThat Phoney Nickel (1930-1933, bottom), Little Brother Hugo (1944-1973)
The GumpsCousin Juniper (1944-1955)
Happy HooliganAnd Her Name Was Maud (1926-1932)
Harold TeenJosie (1935early 40s)
Hollywood JohnnieMovie Struck (1946-1948)
Joe PalookaFisher's Looney Legends (1932-1933), Fisher's History of Boxing (1933-1937), Joe Palooka's Album (1938-1943), War Time Anecdotes (1943-1945)
The Katzenjammer KidsDinglehoofer und His Dog (1926-1951)
Li'l AbnerWashable Jones (1935), Advice fo' Chillun (1935-1943), Small Change (1942-1944)
Little Annie RooneyMing Foo (1935-1943)
Little JimmyMr. Jack (1926–1935)
Little JoeZe Gen'ral (1943-1960s)
Little Orphan AnnieMaw Green (1933-1973)ran along the bottom, last Sunday comics topper
Mickey FinnNippie: He's Often Wrong! (1936-1946)
Mickey MouseSilly Symphony (1932-1945)
Moon MullinsKitty Higgins (1930-1973)
Mutt and JeffCicero's Cat (1933-1972)
Our Boarding HouseThe Nut Bros: Ches and Wal (1931-1965)
Out Our Way with the WilletsWash Tubbs (1927-1933)
Pete the TrampPete's Pup (1932-1935), The Topper Twins (1935), Snorky (1935-1939)
Polly and Her PalsDot and Dash (1926-1928, originally Damon and Pythias), Belles and Wedding Bells (1930-1943, originally Sweethearts and Wives)
Prince ValiantThe Medieval Castle (1944-1945)
Red RyderLittle Beaver (1938-1946)
Reg'lar FellersDaisybelle (1934-1940), Zoolie (1944-1949)
Room and BoardThe Squirrel Cage (1936-1947)
SkippyAlways Belittlin (1926-1940)
SmittyHerby (1931-1974)
Smokey StoverSpooky (1935-1972)
SupermanLois Lane Girl Reporter.
Sweeney & SonJinglet (1933-1960)
Texas Slim and Dirty DaltonBuzzy (1943-1953)
They'll Do It Every TimeLittle Iodine (spinoff, 1943-1983), Hatlo's Inferno (1953-1958)
Thimble TheatreSappo (1926-1947, originally The 5:15), Popeye's Cartoon Club (1934-1935), Wimpy's Zoo's Who (1938-1940)
Tillie the ToilerThe Van Swaggers Starring Aunt Min (1926-1943)
Tim Tyler's Luck (1935-1945)
Toots and CasperIt's Poppa Who Pays! (1926-1956)
Up AnchorWater Lore (1968-1972)
Winnie WinkleLooie (1931-1962)

References

Further reading
Robinson, Jerry, The Comics: An Illustrated History of Comic Strip Art (1974) G.P. Putnam's Sons
Horn, Maurice, The World Encyclopedia of Comics (1976) Chelsea House, (1982) Avon
Blackbeard, Bill, ed. The Smithsonian Collection of Newspaper Comics (1977) Smithsonian Inst. Press/Harry Abrams

Comics formats

Comics terminology